Yedlin is a surname. Notable people with the surname include:

 DeAndre Yedlin (born 1993), American soccer player
 Pablo Yedlin (born 1966), Argentine physician and politician
 Steve Yedlin (born 1975), American cinematographer

See also
 Hedlin